Micrasema is a genus of humpless casemaker caddisflies in the family Brachycentridae. There are more than 70 described species in Micrasema.

Species
These 73 species belong to the genus Micrasema:

 Micrasema abbreviatum Pongracz, 1923
 Micrasema abhavyam Schmid, 1992
 Micrasema adhacharam Schmid, 1992
 Micrasema adhiram Schmid, 1992
 Micrasema aigisthos Malicky, 1997
 Micrasema alexanderi Denning, 1948
 Micrasema anatolicum Botosaneanu, 1974
 Micrasema apratitam Schmid, 1992
 Micrasema arizonicum Ling, 1938
 Micrasema asajjanam Schmid, 1992
 Micrasema asuro Malicky & Chantaramongkol, 1992
 Micrasema avadhiritam Schmid, 1992
 Micrasema bactro Ross, 1938
 Micrasema baitinum Mosely, 1938
 Micrasema bennetti Ross, 1947
 Micrasema bifoliatum Martynov, 1925
 Micrasema borneense Banks, 1931
 Micrasema bricco Malicky & Chantaramongkol, 1992
 Micrasema burksi Ross & Unzicker, 1965
 Micrasema canusa Botosaneanu, 1990
 Micrasema cenerentola Schmid, 1952
 Micrasema charonis Banks, 1914
 Micrasema consimile Mey, 1997
 Micrasema dabhram Schmid, 1992
 Micrasema difficile Mosely, 1934
 Micrasema dimicki (Milne, 1936)
 Micrasema diteris Ross, 1947
 Micrasema etra Denning, 1948
 Micrasema extremum Botosaneanu, 1990
 Micrasema fortiso Malicky & Chantaramongkol, 1992
 Micrasema gabusi Schmid, 1952
 Micrasema gelidum McLachlan, 1876
 Micrasema genjiroense Kobayashi, 1971
 Micrasema gentile McLachlan, 1880
 Micrasema hakonense Kobayashi, 1969
 Micrasema hanasense Tsuda, 1942
 Micrasema helveio Malicky & Chantaramongkol, 1992
 Micrasema jihmam Schmid, 1992
 Micrasema karunam Schmid, 1992
 Micrasema kripanam Schmid, 1992
 Micrasema kurilicum Botosaneanu, 1990
 Micrasema longulum McLachlan, 1876
 Micrasema mencilis Sipahiler, 1995
 Micrasema microcephalum (Pictet, 1834)
 Micrasema minimum McLachlan, 1876
 Micrasema moestum (Hagen, 1868)
 Micrasema morosum (McLachlan, 1868)
 Micrasema naevum (Hagen, 1868)
 Micrasema nepalicum Botosaneanu, 1976
 Micrasema nigrum (Brauer, 1857)
 Micrasema onisca Ross, 1947
 Micrasema oregonum Denning, 1983
 Micrasema ozarkanum Ross & Unzicker, 1965
 Micrasema philomele Malicky, 2000
 Micrasema primoricum Botosaneanu, 1990
 Micrasema prokne Malicky, 2000
 Micrasema punjaubi Mosely, 1938
 Micrasema quadrilobum Martynov, 1933
 Micrasema rickeri Ross & Unzicker, 1965
 Micrasema rusticum (Hagen, 1868)
 Micrasema salardum Schmid, 1952
 Micrasema scissum McLachlan, 1884
 Micrasema scotti Ross, 1947
 Micrasema sericeum Klapálek, 1902
 Micrasema servatum (Navas, 1918)
 Micrasema setiferum (Pictet, 1834)
 Micrasema sprulesi Ross, 1941
 Micrasema tereus Malicky, 2000
 Micrasema togatum (Hagen, 1864)
 Micrasema turbo Malicky & Chantaramongkol, 1992
 Micrasema uenoi Martynov, 1933
 Micrasema vestitum Navas, 1918
 Micrasema wataga Ross, 1938

References

Further reading

External links

 

Trichoptera genera
Articles created by Qbugbot